Wilcox is a surname. Notable people with the surname include:

Adam Wilcox (disambiguation), multiple people
Albert Spencer Wilcox (1844–1919), businessman and politician in the Kingdom of Hawaii
Alex Wilcox, airline executive and entrepreneur
Alfred Wilcox (1884–1954), English recipient of the Victoria Cross
Alonzo Wilcox (1810–1878), American politician
Benjamin M. Wilcox (1854–1912), New York politician
Brad Wilcox (disambiguation), multiple people
Bryce "Zooko" Wilcox-O'Hearn - American cryptoengineer.
Cadmus M. Wilcox (1824–1890), U.S. Army officer and Confederate general in the American Civil War
Carlos Wilcox (1794–1827), American poet
Cathy Wilcox (born 1963), Australian illustrator and cartoonist
Charles Wilcox (disambiguation), multiple people
Chris Wilcox (born 1982), American basketball player
Chris Wilcox (American football) (born 1997), American football player
C. J. Wilcox (born 1990), American basketball player
Collin Wilcox (actress) (1937–2009), American actress
Collin Wilcox (writer) (1924–1996), American writer
Daniel Wilcox (born 1977), American football player
David Wilcox (disambiguation), multiple people
Denys Wilcox (1910–1953), English cricketer and schoolteacher
Desmond Wilcox (1931–2000), British TV documentary maker
Donald Wilcox (1969–2003), American spree killer
Eddie Wilcox (1907–1968), American jazz pianist and arranger
Edgar Wilcox (1830–1917), American politician and farmer
Edward Wilcox (disambiguation), multiple people
Ella Wheeler Wilcox (1850–1919), American author and poet
Floyd Wilcox (1886–1958), American academic administrator
Frank Wilcox (1907–1974), American character actor 
Frank N. Wilcox (1887–1964), American painter
Fred Wilcox (disambiguation), multiple people
George Wilcox (disambiguation), multiple people
Harvey Henderson Wilcox (1832–1891), American real estate developer
Herbert Wilcox (1890–1977), British film producer
Howdy Wilcox (Howard Samuel Wilcox) (1889–1923), American racecar driver
J. J. Wilcox (James Edward Wilcox, Jr.) (born 1991), American football safety
J. Mark Wilcox (James Mark Wilcox) (1890–1956), U.S. Representative from Florida
Jack Wilcox (John Mitchell Wilcox) (1886–1940), English footballer
James Wilcox (actor), American actor; see The Peacock Fan
James Wilcox (novelist) (born 1949), American novelist and professor
James A. Wilcox (born 1952), American economist and professor
James D. Wilcox, American film editor and director
Jason Wilcox (born 1971), English football player
Jeremy Wilcox (born 1979), Canadian volleyball player
Jessica Arline Wilcox, better known as Candy Jones (1925–1990), American model 
John Wilcox (disambiguation), multiple people
Jon P. Wilcox (born 1936), American judge
Judith Wilcox, Baroness Wilcox (born 1940), British noblewoman and politician
Kathi Wilcox (born 1969), American musician
Keith W. Wilcox (1921–2011), general authority of The Church of Jesus Christ of Latter-day Saints
Larry Wilcox (born 1947), American actor
Lisa Wilcox (born 1964), American actress
Mat Wilcox, Canadian businesswoman
Milt Wilcox (born 1950), American baseball player
Mitchell Wilcox (born 1996), American football player
Murray Wilcox, The Hon. Justice, AO, QC (born 1937), Australian Federal Court Justice (retired) 
Paula Wilcox (born 1949), British actress
Rebecca Wilcox (born 1980), British television presenter
Reed N. Wilcox, American academic
Richie Wilcox (born 1980), Canadian contestant on the television show Canadian Idol
Robert Wilcox (disambiguation), multiple people
Roy Wilcox (disambiguation), multiple people
Russ Wilcox (born 1964), English professional footballer and manager
Sheila Willcox (1936–2017), British equestrian
Simon Wilcox (born 1976), Canadian musician, daughter of David Wilcox
Sophie Wilcox (born 1975), English actress
Stephen Wilcox (1830–1893), American inventor of the water tube steam boiler
Terry Fugate-Wilcox (born 1944), American sculptor
Thomas Wilcox (1549–1608), British Puritan clergyman, controversialist, and co-author of "Admonition to Parliament," 1571 (aka 'Puritan Manifesto')
Thomas Wilcox (1622–1687), British Puritan clergyman, and author 
Vernon Wilcox (1918–2004), Australian politician
Walter Wilcox (1869–1949), Canadian mountaineer, explorer of the Canadian Rockies
William Wilcox (disambiguation), multiple people

Fictional characters
Julia Wilcox, character from the American television series Frasier
Several members of the Wilcox family in the novel Howards End.

See also
Wilcock
Wilcox (disambiguation)
Willcock
Willcocks
Willcox (disambiguation)
Willcox (surname)
Willock
Wilcoxon

English-language surnames
Patronymic surnames